Justice Margarita Beatriz Luna Ramos (born January 4, 1956) is a Mexican jurist and former member of the  Supreme Court of Justice of the Nation (SCJN) February 2004 to February 2019.

Born in San Cristóbal de las Casas, Chiapas, Luna Ramos studied law at the National Autonomous University of Mexico (UNAM).

President Vicente Fox  nominated her as a Minister (Associate Justice) of the Supreme Court to fill the vacancy left after the retirement of Juventino Víctor Castro y Castro in 2003. Luna Ramos was confirmed by the Senate with 83 votes in February 2004.

Studies 
In her home state of Chiapas she completed her undergraduate studies and started studying law, and finished her graduate studies in the National Autonomous University of Mexico, where she obtained a Masters and Doctoral degree in Constitutional and Administrative Law. During her academic pursuits she obtained several other degrees, which consist of: judicial specialization in the Institute of Judicial Specialization of the Council of the Federal Judicature; the Diploma on International Commercial Arbitration taught at the Escuela Libre de Derecho and the course on American Law at Ibero University.

References 

Living people
1956 births
20th-century Mexican lawyers
National Autonomous University of Mexico alumni
People from San Cristóbal de las Casas
Supreme Court of Justice of the Nation justices
21st-century Mexican judges
Mexican women judges
21st-century women judges